The rectus capitis posterior minor (or rectus capitis posticus minor, both being Latin for lesser posterior straight muscle of the head) arises by a narrow pointed tendon from the tubercle on the posterior arch of the atlas, and, widening as it ascends, is inserted into the medial part of the inferior nuchal line of the occipital bone and the surface between it and the foramen magnum, and also takes some attachment to the spinal dura mater.

The synergists are the rectus capitis posterior major and the obliquus capitis superior.

Connective tissue bridges were noted at the atlanto-occipital joint between the rectus capitis posterior minor (RCPm) muscle and the dorsal spinal dura. Similar connective tissue connections of the rectus capitis posterior major have been reported recently as well.  The perpendicular arrangement of these fibers appears to restrict dural movement toward the spinal cord. The ligamentum nuchae was found to be continuous with the posterior cervical spinal dura and the lateral portion of the occipital bone. Anatomic structures innervated by cervical nerves C1-C3 have the potential to cause headache pain. Included are the joint complexes of the upper three cervical segments, the dura mater, and spinal cord.

The dura-muscular (myodural) and dura-ligamentous connections in the upper cervical spine and occipital areas may provide anatomic and physiologic answers to the cause of the cervicogenic headache. The level of strain at which RCPm muscle fibers began to tear as a result of overstretching has been estimated to be 30%. This would be expected to put them at risk of injury during whiplash-type distortions when the occipitoatlantal (OA) joint is flexed upon impact. Tearing of the muscle fibers would result in fatty infiltration (FI) that would be expected to impact the functional relationship between the RCPm muscles and the pain sensitive spinal dura. While FI and/or a reduction in the cross sectional area (CSA) of active muscle would not be expected to be the direct cause of chronic headache, it is known that muscle pathology will result in functional deficits. We propose that pathology in RCPm muscles will compromise the normal functional relationship between the RCPm and the pain sensitive dura mater and result in referred head and neck pain. This could help to explain manipulation's efficacy in the treatment of cervicogenic headache.

Additional images

See also
 Atlanto-occipital joint
 Rectus capitis lateralis
 Rectus capitis posterior major muscle
 Rectus capitis anterior muscle

References

External links

 
 
 PTCentral

Muscles of the head and neck